Colin Raymond Griffin (born 8 January 1956) is an English retired professional football central defender who made over 400 appearances in the Football League for Shrewsbury Town and over 500 in total for the club. Griffin later coached at Gay Meadow and was inducted into the club's Hall of Fame in 2012.

Personal life 
After quitting football, Griffin worked as a postman.

Honours 
Shrewsbury Town
 Football League Third Division: 1978–79

References 

1956 births
Living people
English footballers
English Football League players
Shrewsbury Town F.C. players
Sportspeople from Dudley
Association football central defenders
Shrewsbury Town F.C. non-playing staff